Phtheochroa exasperantana is a species of moth of the family Tortricidae. It is found in Tajikistan and Russia.

The wingspan is about 16 mm. Adults have been recorded on wing in August.

References

Moths described in 1872
Phtheochroa